Robert Pack (born May 19, 1929, in New York City) is an American poet and critic, and Distinguished Senior Professor in the  Davidson Honors College at the University of Montana - Missoula. For thirty-four years he taught at Middlebury College and from 1973 to 1995 served as director of the Bread Loaf Writers' Conference. He is the author of twenty-two books of poetry and criticism. Pack has been called, by Harold Bloom, an heir to Robert Frost and Edwin Arlington Robinson, and has himself published a volume of admiring essays on Frost's poetry. He has co-edited several books with Jay Parini, including Writers on Writing: A Breadloaf Anthology.

Biography 
Pack received his B.A. from Dartmouth College in 1951 and an M.A. from Columbia University in 1953. Pack was awarded a Fulbright Fellowship to Italy to translate poetry in 1957. Upon his return, he began teaching at Barnard College. In 1964 Pack was invited to develop a new program in creative writing at Middlebury College. At Middlebury, Pack specialized in poetry workshops, modern British and American Poetry, English Romantic poetry, and the plays of Shakespeare. He was awarded the Abernethy Chair of American Literature and later a special College chair that allowed him to teach across the curriculum. In addition, he served as director of the Bread Loaf Writers' Conference from 1973 to 1995. Among the writers he recruited for the teaching staff were novelists John Gardner and John Irving and poets Howard Nemerov, Donald Justice, and Mark Strand. After retiring from Middlebury College in 1996, Pack and his wife Patty moved to Montana to be nearer to their three children, and Pack began teaching at the University of Montana Honors College. In 2006, the University of Montana awarded Pack its George M. Dennison Presidential Faculty Award for Distinguished Service.

His daughter, Pamela Pack, is a rock climber known for her pursuit of off-width cracks.

Works

Poetry 
 Laughter Before Sleep, University of Chicago Press (2011) 
 Still Here, Still Now, University of Chicago Press (2009) 
 Elk in Winter, University of Chicago Press (2004) 
 Rounding It Out, University of Chicago Press (1999) 
 Minding the Sun, University of Chicago Press (1996) 
 Fathering the Map: New and Selected Later Poems, University of Chicago Press (1993)  
 Before It Vanishes: A Packet of Poems for Professor Pagels, David R. Godine Press (1989)
 Clayfeld Rejoices, Clayfeld Laments: A Sequence of Poems, David R. Godine Press (1987)
 Waking to My Name: New and Selected Poems, Johns Hopkins University Press (1980)
 Keeping Watch, Rutgers University Press (1976)
 Nothing But Light, Rutgers University Press (1972)
 Home from the Cemetery, Rutgers University Press (1969)
 Guarded by Women, Random House (1963)
 A Stranger's Privilege, Macmillan Publishers (1959)
 The Irony of Joy, Scribners (1955)

Prose 
 Willing to Choose: Volition and Storytelling in Shakespeare's Major Plays, Lost Horse Press (2007)
 Literary Genius: 25 Classic Writers Who Define English & American Literature, Paul Dry Books (2007) (Illustrated by Barry Moser)
 Composing Voices: A Cycle of Dramatic Monologues, Lost Horse Press (2005)
 Belief and Uncertainty in the Poetry of Robert Frost, The New England University Press (2003)
 The Long View: Essays on the Discipline of Hope and Poetic Craft, The University of Massachusetts Press (1991)
 Affirming Limits: Essays on Morality, Choice, and Poetic Form, The University of Massachusetts Press (1985)
 Faces in a Single Tree: A Cycle of Monologues, David R. Godine Press (1984)
 Wallace Stevens: An Approach to his Poetry and Thought, Rutgers University Press (1958)

References

External links 
 Poetry Foundation website page for Robert Pack
"Go Jump," a poem inspired by Steven Pinker

American male poets
University of Montana faculty
Living people
1929 births